Sandra Day O'Connor (born March 26, 1930) is an American retired attorney and politician who served as the first female associate justice of the Supreme Court of the United States from 1981 to 2006. She was both the first woman nominated and the first confirmed to the court. Nominated by President Ronald Reagan, she was considered a swing vote for the Rehnquist Court and the first five months of the Roberts Court.

Prior to O'Connor's tenure on the Court, she was a judge and an elected official in Arizona, serving as the first female majority leader of a state senate as the Republican leader in the Arizona Senate. Upon her nomination to the Court, O'Connor was confirmed unanimously by the Senate. On July 1, 2005, she announced her intention to retire effective upon the confirmation of a successor. Samuel Alito was nominated to take her seat in October 2005 and joined the Court on January 31, 2006.

O'Connor most frequently sided with the Court's conservative bloc but demonstrated an ability to side with the Court's liberal members. She often wrote concurring opinions that sought to limit the reach of the majority holding. Her majority opinions in landmark cases include Grutter v. Bollinger and Hamdi v. Rumsfeld. She also wrote in part the per curiam majority opinion in Bush v. Gore, and was one of three co-authors of the lead opinion in Planned Parenthood v. Casey.

During her time on the Court, some publications ranked O'Connor among the most powerful women in the world. After retiring, she succeeded Henry Kissinger as the Chancellor of the College of William & Mary. On August 12, 2009, she was awarded the Presidential Medal of Freedom by President Barack Obama.

Early life and education
Sandra Day was born in El Paso, Texas, the daughter of Harry Alfred Day, a rancher, and Ada Mae (Wilkey). She grew up on a 198,000-acre cattle ranch near Duncan, Arizona. The ranch was nine miles from the nearest paved road. The family home did not have running water or electricity until Sandra was seven years old. As a youth she owned a .22-caliber rifle and would shoot coyotes and jackrabbits. She began driving as soon as she could see over the dashboard and had to learn to change flat tires herself. Sandra had two younger siblings, a sister and a brother, respectively eight and ten years her junior. Her sister was Ann Day, who served in the Arizona Legislature. She later wrote a book with her brother, H. Alan Day, Lazy B: Growing up on a Cattle Ranch in the American West (2002), about her childhood experiences on the ranch. For most of her early schooling, Day lived in El Paso with her maternal grandmother, and attended school at the Radford School for Girls, a private school. The family cattle ranch was too far from any schools, although Day was able to return to the ranch for holidays and the summer. Day spent her eighth-grade year living at the ranch and riding a bus 32 miles to school. She graduated sixth in her class at Austin High School in El Paso in 1946.

When she was 16 years old, Day enrolled at Stanford University. She graduated magna cum laude with a B.A. in economics in 1950. She continued at Stanford Law School for her law degree in 1952. There, she served on the Stanford Law Review with its presiding editor-in-chief, future Supreme Court chief justice William Rehnquist. Day and Rehnquist dated in 1950. Although the relationship ended before Rehnquist graduated early and moved to Washington, D.C., he wrote to her in 1951 and proposed marriage. Day did not accept the proposal from Rehnquist, one of four she received while a student at Stanford. Day was Order of the Coif, indicating she was in the top 10 percent of her class. O'Connor was also made an honorary member of Phi Beta Kappa by the College of William & Mary in 2008.

Early career and marriage 
While in her final year at Stanford Law School, Day began dating John Jay O'Connor III who was one class year behind her. Six months after her graduation, on December 20, 1952, Day and O'Connor married at her family's ranch.

Upon graduation from law school O'Connor had difficulty finding a paying job as an attorney because of her gender. O'Connor found employment as a deputy county attorney in San Mateo, California, after she offered to work for no salary and without an office, sharing space with a secretary. After a few months she began drawing a small salary as she performed legal research and wrote memos. She worked with San Mateo County district attorney Louis Dematteis and deputy district attorney Keith Sorensen.

When her husband was drafted, O'Connor decided to pick up and go with him to work in Germany as a civilian attorney for the Army's Quartermaster Corps. They remained there for three years before returning to the states where they settled in Maricopa County, Arizona, to begin their family. They had three sons: Scott (born 1958), Brian (born 1960), and Jay (born 1962). Following Brian's birth, O'Connor took a five-year hiatus from the practice of law.

She volunteered in various political organizations, such as the Maricopa County Young Republicans, and served on the presidential campaign for Arizona Senator Barry Goldwater in 1964.

O'Connor served as assistant Attorney General of Arizona from 1965 to 1969. In 1969, the governor of Arizona appointed O'Connor to fill a vacancy in the Arizona Senate. She ran for and won the election for the seat the following year. By 1973, she became the first woman to serve as Arizona's or any state's Majority Leader. She developed a reputation as a skilled negotiator and a moderate. After serving two full terms, O'Connor decided to leave the Senate.

In 1974, O'Connor was appointed to the Maricopa County Superior Court, serving from 1975 to 1979 when she was elevated to the Arizona State Court of Appeals. She served on the Court of Appeals-Division One until 1981 when she was appointed to the Supreme Court by President Ronald Reagan.

Supreme Court career

Nomination and confirmation

On July 7, 1981, Reagan – who had pledged during his 1980 presidential campaign to appoint the first woman to the Court – announced he would nominate O'Connor as an associate justice of the Supreme Court to replace the retiring Potter Stewart. O'Connor received notification from President Reagan of her nomination on the day prior to the announcement and did not know that she was a finalist for the position.

Reagan wrote in his diary on July 6, 1981: "Called Judge O'Connor and told her she was my nominee for supreme court. Already the flak is starting and from my own supporters. Right to Life people say she is pro abortion. She declares abortion is personally repugnant to her. I think she'll make a good justice." O'Connor told Reagan she did not remember whether she had supported repealing Arizona's law banning abortion. However, she had cast a preliminary vote in the Arizona State Senate in 1970 in favor of a bill to repeal the state's criminal-abortion statute. In 1974, O'Connor had opined against a measure to prohibit abortions in some Arizona hospitals. Anti-abortion and religious groups opposed O'Connor's nomination because they suspected, correctly, she would not be willing to overturn Roe v. Wade. U.S. Senate Republicans, including Don Nickles of Oklahoma, Steve Symms of Idaho, and Jesse Helms of North Carolina called the White House to express their discontent over the nomination; Nickles said he and "other profamily Republican senators would not support O'Connor". Helms, Nickles, and Symms nevertheless voted for confirmation.

Reagan formally nominated O'Connor on August 19, 1981.

Conservative activists such as the Reverend Jerry Falwell, Howard Phillips, and Peter Gemma also spoke out against the nomination. Gemma called the nomination "a direct contradiction of the Republican platform to everything that candidate Reagan said and even President Reagan has said in regard to social issues." Gemma, the executive director of the National Pro-Life Political Action Committee, had sought to delay O'Connor's confirmation by challenging her record, including support for the Equal Rights Amendment.

O'Connor's confirmation hearing before the Senate Judiciary Committee began on September 9, 1981. It was the first televised confirmation hearing for a Supreme Court justice. The confirmation hearing lasted three days and largely focused on the issue of abortion. When asked, O'Connor refused to telegraph her views on abortion, and she was careful not to leave the impression that she supported abortion rights. The Judiciary Committee approved O'Connor with seventeen votes in favor and one vote of present.

On September 21, O'Connor was confirmed by the U.S. Senate with a vote of 99–0. Only Senator Max Baucus of Montana was absent from the vote, and he sent O'Connor a copy of A River Runs Through It by way of apology. In her first year on the Court she received over 60,000 letters from the public, more than any other justice in history.

Tenure 
O'Connor has said she felt a responsibility to demonstrate women could do the job of justice. She faced some practical concerns, including the lack of a woman's restroom near the Courtroom.

Two years after O'Connor joined the Court, The New York Times published an editorial which mentioned the "nine men" of the "SCOTUS", or Supreme Court of the United States. O'Connor responded with a letter to the editor reminding the Times that the Court was no longer composed of nine men and referred to herself as FWOTSC (First Woman On The Supreme Court).

O'Connor was a proponent of collegiality among justices on the court, often insisting that the justices eat lunch together.

In 1993, Ruth Bader Ginsburg became the second female Supreme Court justice. O'Connor said she felt relief from the media clamor when she was no longer the only woman on the Court. In May 2010, O'Connor warned female Supreme Court nominee Elena Kagan about the "unpleasant" process of confirmation hearings.

Supreme Court jurisprudence

Initially, O'Connor's voting record aligned closely with the conservative William Rehnquist (voting with him 87% of the time her first three years at the Court). From that time until 1998, O'Connor's alignment with Rehnquist ranged from 93.4% to 63.2%, hitting above 90% in three of those years. In nine of her first sixteen years on the Court, O'Connor voted with Rehnquist more than with any other justice.

Later on, as the Court's make-up became more conservative (e.g., Anthony Kennedy replacing Lewis Powell, and Clarence Thomas replacing Thurgood Marshall), O'Connor often became the swing vote on the Court. However, she usually disappointed the Court's more liberal bloc in contentious 5–4 decisions: from 1994 to 2004, she joined the traditional conservative bloc of Rehnquist, Antonin Scalia, Anthony Kennedy, and Thomas 82 times; she joined the liberal bloc of John Paul Stevens, David Souter, Ruth Bader Ginsburg, and Stephen Breyer only 28 times.

O'Connor's relatively small shift away from conservatives on the Court seems to have been due at least in part to Thomas's views. When Thomas and O'Connor were voting on the same side, she would typically write a separate opinion of her own, refusing to join his. In the 1992 term, O'Connor did not join a single one of Thomas's dissents.

Some notable cases in which O'Connor joined the majority in a 5–4 decision were:
 McConnell v. FEC, upholding the constitutionality of most of the McCain-Feingold campaign-finance bill regulating "soft money" contributions.
 Grutter v. Bollinger,  and Gratz v. Bollinger, O'Connor wrote the opinion of the Court in Grutter and joined the majority in Gratz. In this pair of cases, the University of Michigan's undergraduate admissions program was held to have engaged in unconstitutional reverse discrimination, but the more-limited type of affirmative action in the University of Michigan Law School's admissions program was held to have been constitutional.
 Lockyer v. Andrade, : O'Connor wrote the majority opinion, with the four conservative justices concurring, that a 50-year to life sentence without parole for petty shoplifting a few children's videotapes under California's three strikes law was not cruel and unusual punishment under the Eighth Amendment because there was no "clearly established" law to that effect. Leandro Andrade, a Latino nine year Army veteran and father of three, will be eligible for parole in 2046 at age eighty-seven.
 Zelman v. Simmons-Harris, O'Connor joined the majority holding that the use of school vouchers for religious schools did not violate the First Amendment's Establishment Clause.
 United States v. Lopez, : O'Connor joined a majority holding unconstitutional the Gun-Free School Zones Act as beyond Congress's Commerce Clause power.
 Bush v. Gore, O'Connor joined with four other justices on December 12, 2000, to rule on the Bush v. Gore case that ceased challenges to the results of the 2000 presidential election (ruling to stop the ongoing Florida election recount and to allow no further recounts). This case effectively ended Gore's hopes to become president. Some legal scholars have argued that she should have recused herself from this case, citing several reports that she became upset when the media initially announced that Gore had won Florida, with her husband explaining that they would have to wait another four years before retiring to Arizona. O'Connor expressed surprise that the decision became controversial. Some people in Washington stopped shaking her hand after the decision, and Arthur Miller confronted her about it at the Kennedy Center.

O'Connor played an important role in other notable cases, such as:
 Webster v. Reproductive Health Services, : This decision upheld as constitutional state restrictions on second trimester abortions that are not necessary to protect maternal health, contrary to the original trimester requirements in Roe v. Wade. Although O'Connor joined the majority, which also included Rehnquist, Scalia, Kennedy and Byron White, in a concurring opinion she refused to explicitly overturn Roe.

On February 22, 2005, with Rehnquist and Stevens (who were senior to her) absent, she became the senior justice presiding over oral arguments in the case of Kelo v. City of New London and becoming the first woman to do so before the Court.

First Amendment
Justice O'Connor was unpredictable in many of her court decisions, especially those regarding First Amendment Establishment Clause issues. Avoiding ideology, she decided on a case-by-case basis and voted with careful deliberation in a way that she felt benefited individual rights and the Constitution (which she viewed to be "an ever changing work in progress"). Barry Lynn, executive director of Americans United for Separation of Church and State, said, "O'Connor was a conservative, but she saw the complexity of church-state issues and tried to choose a course that respected the country's religious diversity" (Hudson 2005). O'Connor voted in favor of religious institutions, such as in Zelman v. Simmons-Harris, Mitchell v. Helms, and Rosenberger v. University of Virginia. Conversely, in Lee v. Weisman she was part of the majority in the case that saw religious prayer and pressure to stand in silence at a graduation ceremony as part of a religious act that coerced people to support or to participate in religion, which is strictly prohibited by the Establishment Clause. This is consistent with a similar case, Santa Fe Independent School District v. Doe, involving prayer at a school football game. In this case, O'Connor joined the majority opinion that stated prayer at school football games violates the Establishment Clause. O'Connor was the first justice to articulate the "no endorsement" standard for the Establishment Clause. In Lynch v. Donnelly, O'Connor signed onto a five-justice majority opinion holding that a nativity scene in a public Christmas display did not violate the First Amendment. She penned a concurrence in that case, opining that the crèche was not violative of the Establishment Clause because it did not express an endorsement or disapproval of any religion.

Fourth Amendment 
According to law professor Jeffrey Rosen, "O'Connor was an eloquent opponent of intrusive group searches that threatened privacy without increasing security. In a 1983 opinion upholding searches by drug-sniffing dogs, she recognized that a search is most likely to be considered constitutionally reasonable if it is very effective at discovering contraband without revealing innocent but embarrassing information." Washington College of Law professor Andrew Taslitz, referencing O'Connor's dissent in a 2001 case, said of her Fourth Amendment jurisprudence: "O'Connor recognizes that needless humiliation of an individual is an important factor in determining Fourth Amendment reasonableness." O'Connor once quoted the social contract theory of John Locke as influencing her views on the reasonableness and constitutionality of government action.

Cases involving race
In the 1990 and 1995 Missouri v. Jenkins rulings, O'Connor voted with the majority that district courts had no authority to require the state of Missouri to increase school funding in order to counteract racial inequality. In the 1991 Freeman v. Pitts case, O'Connor joined a concurring opinion in a plurality, agreeing that a school district that had formerly been under judicial review for racial segregation could be freed of this review, even though not all desegregation targets had been met. Law professor Herman Schwartz criticized these rulings, writing that in both cases "both the fact and effects of segregation were still present."

In McCleskey v. Kemp in 1987, O'Connor joined a 5–4 majority that voted to uphold the death penalty for an African American man, Warren McCleskey, convicted of killing a white police officer, despite statistical evidence that black defendants were more likely to receive the death penalty than others both in Georgia and in the U.S. as a whole.

In 1996's Shaw v. Hunt and Shaw v. Reno, O'Connor joined a Rehnquist opinion, following an earlier precedent from an opinion she authored in 1993, in which the Court struck down an electoral districting plan designed to facilitate the election of two black representatives out of twelve from North Carolina, a state that had not had any black representative since Reconstruction, despite being approximately 20% blackthe Court held that the districts were unacceptably gerrymandered and O'Connor called the odd shape of the district in question, North Carolina's 12th, "bizarre".

Law Professor Herman Schwartz called O'Connor "the Court's leader in its assault on racially oriented affirmative action," although she joined with the Court in upholding the constitutionality of race-based admissions to universities.

In 2003, O'Connor authored a majority Supreme Court opinion (Grutter v. Bollinger) saying racial affirmative action shouldn't be constitutional permanently, but long enough to correct past discriminationwith an approximate limit of around 25 years.

Abortion
The Christian right element in the Reagan coalition strongly supported him in 1980, in the belief that he would appoint Supreme Court justices to overturn Roe v. Wade. They were astonished and dismayed when his first appointment was O'Connor, whom they feared would tolerate abortion. They worked hard to defeat her confirmation but failed. In her confirmation hearings and early days on the Court, O'Connor was carefully ambiguous on the issue of abortion, as some conservatives questioned her anti-abortion credentials on the basis of some of her votes in the Arizona legislature. O'Connor generally dissented from 1980s opinions which took an expansive view of Roe v. Wade; she criticized that decision's "trimester approach" sharply in her dissent in 1983's City of Akron v. Akron Center for Reproductive Health. She criticized Roe in Thornburgh v. American College of Obstetricians and Gynecologists: "... I dispute not only the wisdom but also the legitimacy of the Court's attempt to discredit and pre-empt state abortion regulation regardless of the interests it serves and the impact it has." In 1989, O'Connor stated during the deliberations over the Webster case that she would not overrule Roe. While on the Court, O'Connor did not vote to strike down any restrictions on abortion until Hodgson v. Minnesota in 1990.

O'Connor allowed certain limits to be placed on access to abortion, but supported the right to abortion established by Roe. In Planned Parenthood v. Casey, O'Connor used a test she had originally developed in City of Akron v. Akron Center for Reproductive Health to limit the holding of Roe v. Wade, opening up a legislative portal where a State could enact measures so long as they did not place an "undue burden" on a woman's right to an abortion. Casey revised downward the standard of scrutiny federal courts would apply to state abortion restrictions, a major departure from Roe. However, it preserved Roe's core constitutional precept: that the Fourteenth Amendment implies and protects a woman's fundamental right to control the outcomes of her reproductive actions. Writing the plurality opinion for the Court, O'Connor, along with justices Kennedy and Souter, famously declared: "At the heart of liberty is the right to define one's own concept of existence, of meaning, of the universe, and of the mystery of human life. Beliefs about these matters could not define the attributes of personhood were they formed under compulsion of the State."

Foreign law
O'Connor was a vigorous defender of the citing of foreign laws in judicial decisions. On October 28, 2003, O'Connor spoke at the Southern Center for International Studies:

The impressions we create in this world are important and can leave their mark ... [T]here is talk today about the "internationalization of legal relations". We are already seeing this in American courts, and should see it increasingly in the future. This does not mean, of course, that our courts can or should abandon their character as domestic institutions. But conclusions reached by other countries and by the international community, although not formally binding upon our decisions, should at times constitute persuasive authority in American courtswhat is sometimes called "transjudicialism".

In the speech she noted the 2002 Court case Atkins v. Virginia, in which the majority decision (which included her) cited disapproval of the death penalty in Europe as part of its argument. This speech, and the general concept of relying on foreign law and opinion, was widely criticized by conservatives. In May 2004, a committee in the U.S. House of Representatives responded by passing a non-binding resolution, the "Reaffirmation of American Independence Resolution", stating that "U.S. judicial decisions should not be based on any foreign laws, court decisions, or pronouncements of foreign governments unless they are relevant to determining the meaning of American constitutional and statutory law."

O'Connor once quoted the constitution of the Middle Eastern nation of Bahrain, which states that "[n]o authority shall prevail over the judgement of a judge, and under no circumstances may the course of justice be interfered with." Further, "[i]t is in everyone's interest to foster the rule-of-law evolution." O'Connor proposed that such ideas be taught in American law schools, high schools and universities. Critics contend that such thinking is contrary to the U.S. Constitution and establishes a rule of man, rather than law. In her retirement, she has continued to speak and organize conferences on the issue of judicial independence.

Commentary and analysis
O'Connor's case-by-case approach routinely placed her in the center of the Court and drew both criticism and praise. Washington Post columnist Charles Krauthammer, for example, described her as lacking a judicial philosophy and instead displaying "political positioning embedded in a social agenda." Conservative commentator Ramesh Ponnuru wrote that, even though O'Connor "has voted reasonably well", her tendency to issue very case-specific rulings "undermines the predictability of the law and aggrandizes the judicial role."

Law clerks serving the Court in 2000 speculated that the decision she reached in Bush v. Gore was based on a desire to appear fair, rather than on any legal rationale, pointing to a memo she sent out the night before the decision was issued that used entirely different logic to reach the same result. They also characterized her approach to cases as deciding on "gut feelings".

Other activities while serving on the Court 
In 2003, she wrote a book titled The Majesty of the Law: Reflections of a Supreme Court Justice. In 2005, she wrote a children's book, Chico, named for her favorite horse, which offered an autobiographical depiction of her childhood.

Retirement
On December 12, 2000, The Wall Street Journal reported that O'Connor was reluctant to retire with a Democrat in the presidency: "At an Election Night party at the Washington, D.C., home of Mary Ann Stoessel, widow of former Ambassador Walter Stoessel, the justice's husband, John O'Connor, mentioned to others her desire to step down, according to three witnesses. But Mr. O'Connor said his wife would be reluctant to retire if a Democrat were in the White House and would choose her replacement. Justice O'Connor declined to comment."

By 2005, the composition of the Court had been unchanged for eleven years, the second-longest period in American history without any such change. Rehnquist was widely expected to be the first justice to retire during Bush's term, owing to his age and his battle with cancer, although rumors of O'Connor's possible retirement circulated as well.

On July 1, 2005, O'Connor announced her intention to retire. In her letter to Bush, she stated that her retirement from active service would take effect upon the confirmation of her successor. Her letter did not provide a reason for her departure; however, a Supreme Court spokeswoman confirmed O'Connor was leaving to spend time with her husband.

On July 19, Bush nominated D.C. Circuit Judge John Roberts to succeed O'Connor. O'Connor heard the news over the car radio on the way back from a fishing trip. She felt he was an excellent and highly qualified choicehe had argued numerous cases before the Court during her tenure. However, she was disappointed that her replacement was not a woman.

O'Connor had expected to leave the Court before the next term started on October 3, 2005. However, Rehnquist died on September 3, creating an immediate vacancy on the Court. Two days later, Bush withdrew Roberts as his nominee for her seat and instead appointed him to fill the vacant office of chief justice. O'Connor agreed to stay on the Court until her replacement was named and confirmed. She spoke at the late chief justice's funeral. On October 3, Bush nominated White House Counsel Harriet Miers to replace O'Connor. After much criticism and controversy over her nomination, on October 27, Miers asked Bush to withdraw her nomination. Bush accepted, reopening the search for O'Connor's successor.

The continued delays in confirming a successor further extended O'Connor's time on the Court. She continued to hear oral argument on cases, including cases dealing with controversial issues such as physician-assisted suicide and abortion. O'Connor's last Court opinion, Ayotte v. Planned Parenthood of New England, written for a unanimous court, was a procedural decision that involved a challenge to a New Hampshire abortion law.

On October 31, Bush nominated Third Circuit Judge Samuel Alito to replace O'Connor; Alito was confirmed by a 58–42 vote and was sworn in on January 31, 2006. After retiring, she continued to hear cases and rendered over a dozen opinions in federal appellate courts across the country, filling in as a substitute judge when vacations or vacancies left their three-member panels understaffed. On Alito's nomination, O'Connor said, "I've often said, it's wonderful to be the first to do something but I didn't want to be the last. If I didn't do a good job, it might've been the last and indeed when I retired, I was not replaced, then, by a woman which gives one pause to think 'Oh, what did I do wrong that led to this.'"

Post-Supreme Court career

During a March 2006 speech at Georgetown University, O'Connor said some political attacks on the independence of the courts pose a direct threat to the constitutional freedoms of Americans. She said "any reform of the system is debatable as long as it is not motivated by retaliation for decisions that political leaders disagree with", also noting that she was "against judicial reforms driven by nakedly partisan reasoning." "Courts interpret the law as it was written, not as the congressmen might have wished it was written", and "it takes a lot of degeneration before a country falls into dictatorship, but we should avoid these ends by avoiding these beginnings." She echoed her concerns for an independent judiciary during the dedication address at the Elon University School of Law in September of that same year.

On November 19, 2008, O'Connor published an introductory essay to a themed issue on judicial accountability in the Denver University Law Review. She called for a better public understanding of judicial accountability. On November 7, 2007, at a conference on her landmark opinion in Strickland v. Washington (1984) sponsored by the Constitution Project, O'Connor highlighted the lack of proper legal representation for many of the poorest defendants. O'Connor also urged the creation of a system for "merit selection for judges," a cause for which she had frequently advocated.

On August 7, 2008, O'Connor and Abdurrahman Wahid, former President of Indonesia, wrote an editorial in the Financial Times stating concerns about the threatened imprisonment of Malaysian opposition leader Anwar Ibrahim.

In October 2008, O'Connor spoke on racial equality in education at a conference hosted by the Charles Hamilton Houston Institute for Race and Justice at Harvard Law School. Later in the conference, she was awarded the Charles Hamilton Houston Justice Award alongside Desmond Tutu and Dolores Huerta.

Following the Court's Citizens United v. Federal Election Commission decision on corporate political spending, O'Connor offered measured criticism of the decision, telling Georgetown law students and lawyers, "that the Court has created an unwelcome new path for wealthy interests to exert influence on judicial elections."

O'Connor argued in favor of President Barack Obama naming the replacement for Antonin Scalia in February 2016, mere days after Scalia's death, opposing Republican arguments that the next president should get to fill the vacancy. She said, "I think we need somebody there to do the job now and let's get on with it"; and that "[y]ou just have to pick the best person you can under the circumstances, as the appointing authority must do. It's an important position and one that we care about as a nation and as a people. And I wish the president well as he makes choices and goes down that line. It's hard."

Judge William H. Pryor Jr., a conservative jurist, has criticized O'Connor's speeches and op-eds for hyperbole and factual inaccuracy, based in part on O'Connor's opinions as to whether judges face a rougher time in the public eye today than in the past.

O'Connor has reflected on her time on the Supreme Court by saying that she regrets the Court hearing the Bush v. Gore case in 2000 because it "stirred up the public" and "gave the Court a less-than-perfect reputation." The former justice told the Chicago Tribune that "Maybe the Court should have said, 'We're not going to take it, goodbye,' ... It turned out the election authorities in Florida hadn't done a real good job there and kind of messed it up. And probably the Supreme Court added to the problem at the end of the day."

Activities and memberships
As a retired Supreme Court Justice, O'Connor continued to receive a full salary, maintained a staffed office with at least one law clerk, and heard cases on a part-time basis in federal district courts and courts of appeals as a visiting judge. By 2008, O'Connor had sat for cases with the 2nd, 8th, and 9th Circuits. O'Connor heard an Arizona voting rights case which the Supreme Court later reviewed. In Arizona v. Inter Tribal Council of Arizona, a 7–2 majority affirmed O'Connor and the rest of 9th Circuit panel, and struck down a provision of Arizona's voting registration law. O'Connor hired a law clerk for the October 2015 term, but did not hire a law clerk for the subsequent term.

The Sandra Day O'Connor Project on the State of the Judiciary, named for O'Connor, held annual conferences from 2006 through 2008 on the independence of the judiciary.

Since 2006, she has been a trustee on the board of the Rockefeller Foundation.

On October 4, 2005, the College of William & Mary announced that O'Connor had accepted the largely ceremonial role of becoming the 23rd Chancellor of the college. O'Connor continued in the role until 2012.

O'Connor was a member of the 2006 Iraq Study Group, appointed by the U.S. Congress.

O'Connor chaired the Jamestown 2007 celebration, commemorating the 400th anniversary of the founding of the colony at Jamestown, Virginia in 1607.

O'Connor was a member of both the American Philosophical Society and the American Academy of Arts and Sciences.

Teaching 
As of Spring 2006, O'Connor taught a two-week course called "The Supreme Court" at the University of Arizona's James E. Rogers College of Law every spring semester. In the fall of 2007, O'Connor and W. Scott Bales taught a course at the Sandra Day O'Connor College of Law at Arizona State University.

Publishing 
She wrote the 2013 book Out of Order: Stories from the History of the Supreme Court.

Public speaking engagements 
On May 15, 2006, O'Connor gave the commencement address at the William & Mary School of Law, where she said that judicial independence is "under serious attack at both the state and national level".

In 2008, O'Connor was named an inaugural Harry Rathbun Visiting Fellow by the Office for Religious Life at Stanford University. On April 22, 2008, she gave "Harry's Last Lecture on a Meaningful Life" in honor of the former Stanford Law professor who shaped her undergraduate and law careers.

On September 17, 2014, O'Connor appeared on the television show Jeopardy! and provided a couple of video answers to the category 'Supreme Court' which appeared on the show. On the same day in Concord, New Hampshire, she gave a talk alongside her former colleague Justice David Souter about the importance of meaningful civics education in the United States.

Non-profits and philanthropic activity 
In February 2009, O'Connor launched Our Courts, a website she created to offer interactive civics lessons to students and teachers because she was concerned about the lack of knowledge among most young Americans about how their government works. She also serves as a co-chair with Lee H. Hamilton for the Campaign for the Civic Mission of Schools. On March 3, 2009, O'Connor appeared on the satirical television program The Daily Show with Jon Stewart to promote the website. In August 2009, the website added two online interactive games. The initiative expanded, becoming iCivics in May 2010 offering free lesson plans, games, and interactive videogames for middle and high school educators. By 2015, the iCivics games had 72,000 teachers as registered users and its games had been played 30 million times.

She served on the board of trustees of the National Constitution Center in Philadelphia, a museum dedicated to the U.S. Constitution. By November 2015, O'Connor had transitioned to being a Trustee Emeritus for the center. In April 2013, the Board of Directors of Justice at Stake, a national judicial reform advocacy organization, announced that O'Connor would be joining the organization as Honorary Chair."

In 2009, O'Connor founded the 501(c)(3) non-profit organization now known as the Sandra Day O'Connor Institute. Its programs are dedicated to promoting civil discourse, civic engagement, and civics education. In 2019, her former adobe residence in Arizona, curated by the O'Connor Institute, was listed on the National Register of Historic Places. In 2020, the Institute launched O'Connor U, its multigenerational digital platform. O'Connor serves as Founder and Advisor to the O'Connor Institute.

She was a member and president of the Junior League of Phoenix.

O'Connor was a founding co-chair of the National Advisory Board at the National Institute for Civil Discourse (NICD). The institute was created at the University of Arizona after the 2011 shooting of former Congresswoman Gabby Giffords that killed six people and wounded 13 others.

Personal life 
Upon her appointment to the Supreme Court, O'Connor and her husband moved to the Kalorama area of Washington, D.C. The O'Connors became active in the Washington D.C. social scene. O'Connor played tennis and golf in her spare time. She is a baptized member of the Episcopal Church.

O'Connor was successfully treated for breast cancer in 1988 (she also had her appendix removed that year). That same year, John O'Connor left the Washington, D.C. law firm of Miller & Chevalier for a practice which required him to split his time between Washington, D.C., and Phoenix.

Her husband suffered from Alzheimer's disease for nearly 20 years, until his death in 2009, and she became involved in raising awareness of the disease. After retiring from the Court, O'Connor moved back to Phoenix, Arizona.

Around 2013, O'Connor's friends and colleagues noticed that O'Connor was becoming more forgetful and less conversational. By 2017, back problems led to O'Connor needing to use a wheelchair and led to her moving to an assisted living facility. In October 2018, O'Connor announced her effective retirement from public life after disclosing that she had been diagnosed with the early stages of Alzheimer's-like dementia.

On May 7, 2016, her younger sister, Ann Day, was killed in a car accident in Tucson, Arizona as a result of a collision with a drunk driver.

Following the death of John Paul Stevens in 2019, O'Connor became the last living Justice to have served on the Burger Court.

Legacy and awards

See also

 List of justices of the Supreme Court of the United States
 List of law clerks of the Supreme Court of the United States (Seat 8)
 List of United States Supreme Court justices by time in office
 United States Supreme Court cases during the Burger Court
 United States Supreme Court cases during the Rehnquist Court
 United States Supreme Court cases during the Roberts Court
 List of female state supreme court justices

Explanatory notes

References

Citations

Bibliography

Further reading
 Joan Biskupic, Joan. Sandra Day O'Connor: How the First Woman on the Supreme Court Became Its Most Influential Justice (2005), biography
 Flowers, Prudence. "‘A Prolife Disaster’: The Reagan Administration and the Nomination of Sandra Day O’Connor." Journal of Contemporary History 53.2 (2018): 391–414.
 Montini, E. J. (2005) "Rehnquist is No. 1, O'Connor is No. 3, Baloney is No. 2." The Arizona Republic. Retrieved March 5, 2013.
 , a primary source
 Thomas, Evan, "First: Sandra Day O'Connor" (2019) Random House, authorized biography

External links

 
 Issue positions and quotes at OnTheIssues
 
 Booknotes interview with O'Connor on Lazy B: Growing Up On a Cattle Ranch in the American Southwest, January 27, 2002.
 iCivics.org, project to teach children civics, O'Connor is chairman of the Board

Additional information
 Read Congressional Research Service (CRS) Reports regarding Justice O'Connor
 "O'Connor not bothered by delayed retirement", Associated Press September 28, 2005.
 "Sandra Day O'Connor prepares for final days on Supreme Court", Associated Press, September 19, 2005.
 Cases in which O'Connor has been the deciding vote (July 1, 2005)
 Farewell comments from her fellow justices (July 1, 2005)
 Centrist justice sought 'social stability'
 An Interview with Justice Sandra Day O'Connor Third Branch (August 2009)
 Supreme Court Associate Justice Nomination Hearings on Sandra Day O'Connor in September 1981 United States Government Publishing Office

1930 births
Living people
20th-century American judges
20th-century American lawyers
20th-century American politicians
20th-century American women lawyers
20th-century American women politicians
20th-century American women judges
21st-century American judges
21st-century American women writers
21st-century American women judges
American Episcopalians
American prosecutors
American women legal scholars
Arizona lawyers
Arizona state court judges
Republican Party Arizona state senators
California lawyers
California Republicans
Chancellors of the College of William & Mary
Constitutional court women judges
Cowgirl Hall of Fame inductees
Fellows of the American Academy of Arts and Sciences
Justices of the Supreme Court of the United States
Lawyers from Phoenix, Arizona
Members of the American Philosophical Society
Members of the Junior League
People from Greenlee County, Arizona
People from Kalorama (Washington, D.C.)
Politicians from Phoenix, Arizona
Politicians from El Paso, Texas
Presidential Medal of Freedom recipients
Rockefeller Foundation people
Stanford Law School alumni
Stanford University trustees
United States federal judges appointed by Ronald Reagan
Women state legislators in Arizona
Writers from Phoenix, Arizona
Writers from Texas